Robinson is a railway station serving Sceaux, Hauts-de-Seine, a southern suburb of Paris, France. It is one of the terminuses of the RER B trains.

The station is named after the nearby commune Le Plessis-Robinson (which itself is ultimately named after Robinson Crusoe).

Réseau Express Régional stations in Hauts-de-Seine
Railway stations in France opened in 1893